Louis Auguste de Bourbon, Prince of Dombes (4 March 1700 in Palace of Versailles – 1 October 1755 in Palace of Fontainebleau) was a grandson of Louis XIV of France and of his maîtresse-en-titre Françoise-Athénaïs de Montespan. He was a member of the legitimised House of Bourbon-Maine.

Biography

Born at the Palace of Versailles on 4 March 1700, Louis-Auguste was the fourth child of Louis-Auguste de Bourbon, duc du Maine and of his wife, Anne Louise Bénédicte de Bourbon.

Given the title of prince de Dombes at his birth, he was the second child of his parents to hold the title.

Unlike his father, the prince de Dombes was of high military skill. Louis-Auguste served under the renowned military commander Prince Eugene of Savoy in the Austro-Turkish War (1716–1718). He also fought in the War of the Polish Succession (1733–1738) and in the War of the Austrian Succession (1740–1748).

Upon the death of his father (to whom he was very close), on 14 May 1736 at the Château de Sceaux, he inherited the bulk of his wealth and his titles.

He became Colonel General of the Cent-Suisses et Grisons (1710), Governor of Languedoc (1737), Grand veneur de France and Count of Eu (1736).

In 1750, he gained the titles of prince d'Anet and comte de Dreux, when his mother gave him both estates three years before she died.  Little seen at the court of his cousin Louis XV of France, he preferred living at the Château d'Anet, which he continued to embellish.  In order to supply water for his gardens, he created a hydraulic system which he installed in the park of the domain near the river Eure. He also enjoyed hunting on his large estate of Eu.

Louis-Auguste remained unmarried and died childless. A possible wife had been his cousin, Charlotte Aglaé d'Orléans, daughter of Philippe II, Duke of Orléans and Françoise-Marie de Bourbon, and another cousin, Louise Anne de Bourbon, daughter of Louise-Françoise de Bourbon, the duc du Maine's younger sister.

Louis-Auguste died on 1 October 1755, at the age of fifty-five, in a duel at Fontainebleau. His younger brother, Louis Charles, was his only heir.

Ancestry

References

1700 births
1755 deaths
People from Versailles
Princes of the Dombes
Counts of Dreux
House of Bourbon-Maine
18th-century French people